Anthony Middleton Dron (29 August 1946 – 16 November 2021) was a British racing driver, motoring author, and journalist.

Racing history
Dron was best known for racing Touring Cars in the 1970s (Triumph Dolomites for the works BL/Broadspeed team) and for competing in Porsches at the 24 Hours of Le Mans in the early-to-mid-1980s, including a class win at Le Mans in 1982 in a Porsche 934, and driving a Group C (Kremer CK-5) in 1983. He was a full-time professional race driver from 1974 to 1979, for teams that included British Leyland, Unipart and Alfa UK, but his career as a racer first began in May 1968 and continued for a full 43 years.

Dron achieved a remarkable range of victories, winning events in 24 makes and 41 models of car. (These are actual wins, not all the makes and models in which he competed.) The total number of wins is not known, but is well into the hundreds.

Race wins have been recorded in:
 Alfa Romeo: 1600GT Junior, TZ1
 Allard: JR
 Aston Martin: DB4
 Austin: Metro
 Austin-Healey: 3000, 100/4
 Bentley: 3-litre
 BMW: Counties 3 Series, M3
 Caterham: Seven (two types)
 Chevrolet: Camaro
 Datsun: 240Z
 Ferrari: 330LMB, 246S
 Fiat: 128 1300GT Coupé
 Ford: Escort Mexico, Falcon, Zephyr Mk II, fwd RS2000
 Jaguar: Mk 1, Mk 2, D-type
 Lister: Jaguar "Knobbly"
 Lotus: Mk 9
 Lola: Mk6GT
 Mazda: 323
 MG: Maestro, MGB
 Morgan: Plus 8
 Porsche: 924, 924GTR, 911RSL, 928S2, 928S4, 930, 934, "935", 911 Carrera 2
 Renault: 5
 Triumph: TR4, Dolomite Sprint
 TVR: Tuscan

In later years, he was also been seen racing (and winning in) an enormous variety of historic cars, including the Le Mans-winning 1959 Aston Martin DBR1 and the 1960 Ferrari 246S Dino. In the Ferrari, Dron won the Sussex Trophy at the Goodwood Revival for three consecutive years. Having competed numerous times in the modern Nürburgring 24 Hours, he was known to be a highly experienced competitor on the old Nordschleife, where historic racing victories include an outright win in the 1996 Eifel Klassik in a 1963 Ferrari 330LMB, from pole position in a field of 180 cars.

Dron retired from race driving in 2011, although he still worked as a motoring journalist and test driver for Octane magazine.

Publications
Dron wrote a regular column in Octane. He was the author of several books, including Porsche: Engineering for Excellence (2008) and Alan Mann – A Life of Chance (2012, with Alan Mann).

Racing record

Complete British Saloon / Touring Car Championship results
(key) (Races in bold indicate pole position; races in italics indicate fastest lap.)

† Events with 2 races staged for the different classes.

‡ Guest driver - Not eligible for points.

References

1946 births
2021 deaths
People from Surbiton
British Touring Car Championship drivers
FIA GT Championship drivers
24 Hours of Le Mans drivers
World Sportscar Championship drivers

Porsche Motorsports drivers